Wagon Automotive is an automotive parts company based in Birmingham, England.

The company is controlled by the American businessman Wilbur Ross and employs over 4,000 workers across Europe.

Background
Wagon has its roots in Wagon Repairs, a business set up at the end of the First World War to maintain railway rolling stock.

The company was chosen by Ross as the foundation for a European car parts empire.

References

External links
Car Ignition Coils
Automobile Solutions

Auto parts suppliers of the United Kingdom
Companies based in Birmingham, West Midlands